Idool 2011 is the fourth season of Idool. A talent show based on the British talent show Pop Idol. It premiered on February 2, 2011. after an absence for four years.

The brothers Koen Wauters and Kris Wauters returned as a host for the fourth time while of the former judges only Jean Blaunt remained at the panel.

Prior to the kick-off of the broadcast an internet viewer had a chance to receive an online wildcard as the most voted online applicant. Saartje D'haveloose won and automatically qualified for the first live show of the 15 semifinalts.

The cast of the show released a single called "More To Me" which went straight to no. 1 at the Flemish Ultratop 50 Single Charts.

Finalists
(ages stated at time of contest)

Live Shows

Top 15 – Contestants Choice

Group Performance: "More To Me"

Top 10 – Back to the 90s

Guest Judge: David Hasselhof
Group Performance: "Everybody's Free (To Feel Good)" (feat. Rozalla)

Top 9 - Made in Belgium

Guest Judge: Alex Callier
Group Performance: "Anger Never Dies" (feat. Hooverphonic)

Top 8 - In Symphony

Guest Judge: Marco Borsato
Group Performance: "Rood"

Top 7 - Idool in Love

Guest Judge: Alexis Jordan
Guest Performance: "Happiness"

Top 6.1 - Rock

Guest Judge: Ray Cokes
Guest Performance: "The Candyshop" (The Baseballs)
Group Performance: "We Will Rock You"

Top 6.2 - Dance & In Da Mix
Guest Judge: Regi Penxten
Group Performance: "Love Generation" (feat. Bob Sinclar)

Top 4 - Foute Muziek
Guest Judge: Sven Ornelis & Kurt Rogiers
Group Performance:

Top 3 - Choices
Guest Judge: Dan Karaty
Group Performance:

Top 2 - Finale
Guest Judge: Natalia
Group Performance:

Elimination Chart

References

External links
 Official website

Idool (TV series)
2011 Belgian television seasons